Slovenia competed in the Eurovision Song Contest 2002, represented by Sestre with "Samo ljubezen" (Only love). The song was the winner of the Slovene national final, EMA 2002.

Before Eurovision

EMA 2002 
EMA 2002 was the 7th edition of the Slovenian national final format Evrovizijska Melodija (EMA). The competition was used by RTV Slovenija to select Slovenia's entry for the Eurovision Song Contest 2002.

Format 
EMA 2002 consisted of a semi final on 15 February 2002 and a final on 16 February 2002. Eighteen artists competed in EMA 2002. In the semi-final, 10 songs qualified to the final as five songs were selected by the Slovenian public and the other five songs were selected by the jury. In the final, the combination of points from a public vote, an expert jury and a jury composed of members from the Entertainment Program of RTV Slovenija determined the winner.

Semi-final
The semi-final of EMA 2002 took place on 15 February 2002 at the RTV Slovenija studios in Ljubljana, hosted by Nuša Derenda, Darja Švajger and Andrea F. Ten acts qualified for the final: five entries were chosen with the most votes cast by the viewers and five other finalist entries were selected by the jury.

Final
The final of EMA 2002 took place on 16 February 2002 at the RTV Slovenija studios in Ljubljana, hosted by Miša Molk and Andrea F. The combination of points from a public vote, an expert jury and a RTV Slovenija jury determined the winner. Both juries put Sestre ahead of Stavec before a five-minute hiatus for the results of the televote to be collated. As five minutes stretched into twenty, the green room began to divide into two camps, half the performers shouting for Stavec and the rest for Sestre. Although Stavec received 31,944 votes from the public, with Sestre only receiving 8,454, the votes from the two juries were sufficient to determine Sestre as the final winner. On 19 February 2002, the results of the televote were invalidated in its entirety, as the televote lines were open for 8 minutes instead of the prescribed 5.

At Eurovision
At Eurovision Sestre performed "Samo ljubezen" 22nd in the running order, following Romania and preceding Latvia. The Slovene votes were calculated partially through a public televote held after all songs had performed and partially through the votes of a professional jury.

At the close of the voting, Slovenia placed 13th in a field of 24, having received 33 points. Croatia's Vesna Pisarović with "Everything I Want" was the most voted song by the Slovene public, gaining their 12 points. Malta and the United Kingdom received Slovenia's 10 and 8 points respectively, while eventual winner Latvia received only 5 points.

Voting

References

External links
Slovene National Final 2002

2002
Countries in the Eurovision Song Contest 2002
Eurovision